Fu Ying (January 19, 1902 – September 7, 1979) was a Chinese chemist, who was a member of the Chinese Academy of Sciences.

References 

1902 births
1979 deaths
Members of the Chinese Academy of Sciences